The following is a summary of the 2017–18 season of competitive football in Switzerland.

Men's national team
The home team is on the left column; the away team is on the right column.

2018 FIFA World Cup

2018 FIFA World Cup qualification

Switzerland won 1–0 on aggregate and qualified for the 2018 FIFA World Cup.

Friendly matches

Women's national team
The home team is on the left column; the away team is on the right column.

FIFA Women's World Cup 2019 qualification

2018 Cyprus Women's Cup

Friendly matches

League standings

Raiffeisen Super League

Brack.ch Challenge League

Swiss Clubs in Europe

BSC Young Boys

UEFA Champions League qualifying phase

3–3 on aggregate. Young Boys won on away goals.

CSKA Moscow won 3–0 on aggregate.

UEFA Europa League group stage

FC Basel

UEFA Champions League group stage

UEFA Champions League knockout phase

Manchester City won 5–2 on aggregate.

FC Lugano

UEFA Europa League group stage

FC Luzern

UEFA Europa League qualifying phase

Osijek won 3–2 on aggregate.

FC Sion

UEFA Europa League qualifying phase

Sūduva Marijampolė won 4–1 on aggregate.

References

 
Seasons in Swiss football